Football Club de Loon-Plage is a football club located in Loon-Plage, France. They play in the Régional 1, the sixth tier of French football. The club's colours are blue and red.

The furthest round in which the club has played in the Coupe de France is the round of 64, which they reached in the 2020–21 edition, losing 3–0 to third-tier Boulogne, and in the 2022–23 edition, losing 7–0 to top flight Reims.

References

External links 

 Club website
FC Loon-Plage at Soccerway
Football clubs in France
Sport in Nord (French department)
Football clubs in Hauts-de-France